The men's flyweight event was part of the boxing programme at the 1936 Summer Olympics. The weight class was the lightest contested, and allowed boxers of up to 112 pounds (50.8 kilograms). The competition was held from Monday, August 10, 1936 to Saturday, August 15, 1936. Twenty-four boxers from 24 nations competed.

Medalists

Results

References

External links
Official Olympic Report
 

Flyweight